Stephen Eric Penfold "Cocky" Farrer (28 October 1907 – 6 August 1994) was a South African cricketer who played five first-class cricket matches for Border: three in 1929–30 and two, as captain, in 1947–48.

Farrer was educated at Grey High School in Port Elizabeth and at Rhodes University, where he obtained a law degree. He married Norah Street in 1934 and they had two children, Margaret and William, known as "Buster". Buster played Test cricket for South Africa and also represented South Africa at tennis and hockey.

After working for some years as a lawyer, Stephen opened a sporting goods shop in King William's Town. He served as president of the Border Cricket Union and president of the Border Lawn Tennis Association.

References

External links

1907 births
1994 deaths
South African cricketers
Border cricketers
People from Makhanda, Eastern Cape
Rhodes University alumni
South African cricket administrators
Cricketers from the Eastern Cape